The Lamb is the third studio album by American musician Lillie West, under music project Lala Lala. It was released on September 28, 2018 under Hardly Art.

Release
On July 13, 2018, the first single "Destroyer" was released. On August 21, 2018, West released the second single from the album, "Water Over Sex". West explained the song and the release of the album: "The Lamb was written during a time of intense paranoia after a home invasion, deaths of loved ones and general violence around me and my friends. I started to frequently and vividly imagine the end of the world, often becoming too frightened to leave my house." The third single "Dove" was released on September 10, 2018, along with the announcement of the new album. On September 28, 2018, the music video for "Scary Movie" was released.

Tour
In support of the album, West announced an American tour from November 2018 to February 2019.

Critical reception
The Lamb was met with "generally favorable" reviews from critics. At Metacritic, which assigns a weighted average rating out of 100 to reviews from mainstream publications, this release received an average score of 75, based on 7 reviews. Aggregator Album of the Year gave the release a 80 out of 100 based on a critical consensus of 8 reviews.

Track listing

Personnel

Musicians
 Lillie West – primary artist, producer
 Emily Kempf – bass, vocals
 Ben Leach – drums
 Sen Morimoto – saxophone

Production
 Dave Vettraino – engineer, mixer

References

External links
 

2018 albums
Hardly Art albums